Spermacoce or false buttonweed is a genus of flowering plants in the family Rubiaceae. It comprises about 275 species found throughout the tropics and subtropics. Its highest diversity is found in the Americas, followed by Africa, Australia and Asia.

Description
The species are herbs or small shrubs with small- to medium-sized, four-lobed flowers arranged in capitate inflorescences. Some have a brightly coloured calyx and are eye-catching, particularly the Australian species. The corolla is variable in colour, often white, but also all shades of blue, pink and maroon. The fruit is usually a two-seeded capsule, sometimes a schizocarp or nut.

Selected species
Spermacoce is a highly diverse genus with about 275 species in many tropical and subtropical places around the globe. North American species include:

Spermacoce alata Aubl. - West Indies, most of Latin America; naturalized in Africa, India, China, Southeast Asia, Australia, Melanesia
Spermacoce assurgens Ruiz & Pav. - synonym of Spermacoce remota
Spermacoce brachysepala (Urb.) Alain in H.A.Liogier & L.F.Martorell - West Indian false buttonweed - Puerto Rico, Haiti, Dominican Republic
Spermacoce capitata Ruiz & Pav. -  baldhead false buttonweed - Central and South America from Belize to Argentina
Spermacoce confusa Rendle -  river false buttonweed - Florida, West Indies, Latin America from Mexico to Argentina
Spermacoce densiflora (DC.) Alain -  bouquet false buttonweed - Florida, West Indies, Latin America from Mexico to Argentina
Spermacoce ernestii Fosberg & Powell - synonym of Spermacoce ovalifolia
Spermacoce eryngioides (Cham. & Schltdl.) Kuntze -  whorled-leaf false buttonweed - West Indies including Puerto Rico; southeastern South America from Bolivia and Brazil to Argentina
Spermacoce exilis (L.O. Williams) C. Adams - Pacific false buttonweed - Latin America from Mexico to Argentina, plus West Indies; naturalized in Africa, China, India, southeast Asia and some tropical oceanic islands
Spermacoce floridana Urb. - synonym of Spermacoce keyensis 
Spermacoce glabra Michx. - smooth false buttonweed - southern and eastern United States (mostly in the Lower Mississippi Valley); also South America 
Spermacoce keyensis Urb. - Florida false buttonweed - southern Florida, Bahamas, southern tip of Texas (Cameron County)
Spermacoce latifolia Aubl. - synonym of Spermacoce alata 
Spermacoce neoterminalis Govaerts - Everglades false buttonweed-  southern Florida
Spermacoce ovalifolia (M. Martens & Galeotti) Hemsl. -  broadleaf false buttonweed - West Indies including Puerto Rico, Latin America from Mexico to Paraguay
Spermacoce ocymoides Burm.f.
Spermacoce prostrata Aubl. -  prostrate false buttonweed - Florida, Mississippi, Alabama, West Indies including Puerto Rico; most of Latin America; naturalized in China, Vietnam, Sri Lanka and Java
Spermacoce remota - Lam. -  woodland false buttonweed - Florida, Georgia, Texas, Alabama, West Indies, much of Latin America; naturalized in Southeast Asia, China, India, New Guinea, Mauritius and many oceanic islands (including Hawaii)
Spermacoce sintenisii (Urb.) Alain - synonym of Spermacoce brachysepala
Spermacoce tenuior L. -  slender false buttonweed - Texas, Louisiana, Georgia, West Indies; Latin America from Mexico to Bolivia; naturalized in Tanzania, Java, Sulawesi and Galápagos
Spermacoce terminalis (Small) Kartesz & Gandhi - synonym of Spermacoce neoterminalis
Spermacoce tetraquetra A. Rich. -  pineland false buttonweed - Florida, West Indies, Mexico, Central America
Spermacoce verticillata L. -  shrubby false buttonweed - Florida, West Indies, most of Latin America; naturalized in Africa, Australia, assorted oceanic islands

References

External links
 World Checklist of Rubiaceae
The Spermacoce of Australia
Flora of China, v 19 p 325, 丰花草属 feng hua cao shu, Spermacoce

Gallery

 
Rubiaceae genera